The 422 class are a class of diesel locomotives built by Clyde Engineering, Granville for the Department of Railways New South Wales in 1969/70.

History
The 422 class were the first Australian locomotives built with non-streamlined dual cab bodies. Manufactured by Clyde Engineering, Granville, they were introduced into service on the Main South and Illawarra lines where they would spend most of their New South Wales careers hauling passenger and freight services. Among the services they hauled were the Canberra Express, Intercapital Daylight, South Coast Daylight Express, Southern Aurora, Spirit of Progress Griffith Express'and 'Sydney/Melbourne Express.

In 1980, 42220 was rebuilt by Clyde Engineering, Rosewater, receiving an AR16 alternator, a new electrical system and Super Series wheel slip technology. It was a test bed for many of the features incorporated into the 81 class.

From 1982, they began to operate through to Melbourne. This ceased in February 1990 when non air-conditioned locomotives would no longer be accepted by Victorian drivers.

With the formation of National Rail, the 422s were all allocated to the new interstate carrier in July 1995 pending delivery of its NR class locomotives. This saw them again frequently operating to Melbourne, albeit usually as second units and over new territory to Parkes via Forbes and from August 1996 via the North Coast line to Brisbane. When they were returned to FreightCorp in September 1997, their Southern duties were now being handled by Class 81s so most were stored.

In 1999, 42202 and 42206 were sold to FreightCorp's North Coast sub-contractor, Northern Rivers Railroad passing with the business to QR National in May 2002.

By January 2000, only 42203 and 42220 remained in service with FreightCorp; these having been fitted with air-conditioning. These were retained primarily to operate CountryLink services from Sydney to Griffith and from January 2000 over new ground on the Outback Express to Broken Hill. These were sold to Chicago Freight Car Leasing Australia in 2001 and later rebuilt as HL203 and FL220.

In May 2000, the other 16 were sold to the Australian Southern Railroad and transferred in one movement from Werris Creek where they had been stored to Dry Creek, Adelaide where they were gradually reactivated. Some were placed in service operating construction trains on the Alice Springs to Darwin line as well as in South Australia and Western Australia. Others returned to New South Wales on hire to other operators. It was decided to rebuild all 16 as the 22 class which among other modifications saw air-conditioning fitted, although only 14 ended up being completed at Downer Rail, Port Augusta.

With the splitting up of Australian Railroad Group, 11 passed to Aurizon in February 2006 and five to One Rail Australia in June 2006.

Status
As at October 2014, 13 remained in service with Aurizon, CFCL Australia and One Rail Australia with seven in store. In January 2015, four were sold to Apex Industrial and exported to Durban, South Africa being scrapped in December 2015. Both CFCL Australia units were sold to Watco Australia in 2016 and transferred to Perth to operate Brookfield Rail infrastructure trains.

References

Further reading

A Guide to Australian Locomotion 2009 Edition Published by Australian Railway Historical Society (NSW)

External links

Aurizon diesel locomotives
Clyde Engineering locomotives
Co-Co locomotives
Diesel locomotives of New South Wales
Railway locomotives introduced in 1969
Standard gauge locomotives of Australia
Diesel-electric locomotives of Australia